The 2019–20 Idaho Vandals men's basketball team represents the University of Idaho in the 2019–20 NCAA Division I men's basketball season. The Vandals, led by interim head coach Zac Claus, play their home games at the Cowan Spectrum, with a few early season games at Memorial Gym, in Moscow, Idaho, as members of the Big Sky Conference.

Previous season
The Vandals finished the 2018–19 season 5–27 overall, 2–18 in Big Sky play to finish in last place. In the Big Sky Conference tournament, they lost to Montana State in the first round.

On June 14, it was announced that head coach Don Verlin's contract would be terminated, effectively ending his tenure with the Vandals. Four days later, on June 18, assistant coach Zac Claus was named interim head coach.

Roster

Schedule and results

|-
!colspan=12 style=| Exhibition

|-
!colspan=12 style=| Non-conference regular season

|-
!colspan=12 style=| Big Sky regular season

|-
!colspan=12 style=| Big Sky tournament
|-

|-

Source

References

Idaho Vandals men's basketball seasons
Idaho Vandals
Idaho Vandals men's basketball
Idaho Vandals men's basketball